This is a list of episodes for the television series Medical Center. This series consists of a two-hour pilot and seven seasons of episodes.

Series overview

Episodes

Pilot (1969)

Season 1 (1969–70)

Season 2 (1970–71)

Season 3 (1971–72)

Season 4 (1972–73)

Season 5 (1973–74)

Season 6 (1974–75)

Season 7 (1975–76)

References

External links
 
 DVD release info at TVShowsOnDVD.com

Medical Center